Resound is the first album released by the Norwegian electronica project Ugress. It was released on Tuba Records/Port Azur in 2002.

Track listing
 "Spider-Man Theme"
 "Queen Of Darkness"
 "E-Pipe"
 "Reason To Believe"
 "Decepticons"
 "Loungemeister"
 "Falling"
 "Autumn Colours"
 "Trigger 22"
 "Kaleido Scope"
 "Atlantis Coastguard Corruption"

Samples used
1. Spider-Man Theme - Beginning from 1960s animated TV series theme.

4. Reason to Believe - Stay with us, we can all be happy here from HellRaiser 1 (1987) and the speech delivered by the gameshow host of The Running Man show at the end of the movie with the same name, featuring Arnold Schwarzenegger (1987).

5. Decepticons - speech by Orson Welles from the Transformers animated movie (1986)

2002 albums
Ugress albums